Dancing with the Stars is a video game based on the TV series of the same name. It was released on October 23, 2007, in the United States. The game is also being developed for mobile phones, and for the PC.

Sequel
A sequel, Dancing with the Stars: We Dance!, was released October 21, 2008 for Wii and Nintendo DS. The game is much improved on the previous ones, with score multipliers, options for new costumes and switching partners, and new songs such as Push It by Salt n' Pepa, Black Horse and the Cherry Tree by KT Tunstall and Lady Marmalade.

Reception

IGN called it a lousy game.

See also
 Dancing with the Stars (U.S. TV series)
 List of Wii games

References

External links
 Official site
 Official site (2016 mobile game)

2007 video games
Activision games
Dance video games
Mobile games
Multiplayer and single-player video games
Music video games
PlayStation 2 games
THQ games
Video games based on Dancing with the Stars
Video games developed in the United Kingdom
Wii games
Windows games
Zoë Mode games